Many lives have been lost by lifeboat crews going to the aid of people and vessels in distress at sea and around the coasts of Britain and Ireland (UK, Republic of Ireland, Channel Islands and the Isle of Man), mainly but not exclusively in the service of the Royal National Lifeboat Institution (RNLI). More than 600 names are inscribed on the RNLI Memorial at RNLI HQ, Poole. Some losses predate the RNLI (founded in 1824).

19th century
In the 19th century, lifeboats were almost exclusively oar and sail powered. Self-righting boats had been developed but were not yet widely adopted.

20th century
During the 20th century many advances were made in safety and durability of lifeboats, including self-righting and motor power. Life jackets were continuously being improved.

See also
Royal National Lifeboat Institution
List of RNLI stations
Independent lifeboats in Britain and Ireland

References

Royal National Lifeboat Institution

Disasters in England
Disasters in Scotland
Disasters in Wales
Disasters in Northern Ireland
Disasters in Ireland
Lifeboat
lifeboat disasters
Lifeboat